Paul Hanley (born 18 February 1964) is an English writer and drummer. He has been the drummer for the Fall (1980–1985), Tom Hingley and the Lovers, and Brix & the Extricated, all alongside his brother Steve Hanley.

Career
Paul Hanley was the drummer in the Fall between 1980 and 1985. For much of that time he was part of a two-drummer line-up with Karl Burns and also played keyboards. He was preceded as a member of the Fall by his brother, Steve, who remained in the band for a further 13 years.

In 2001 Paul began playing with his brother Steve again, this time as part of former Inspiral Carpets singer Tom Hingley's group The Lovers. The Lovers' first album, Abba Are The Enemy was released in 2004. Their second, Highlights, was released in March 2008.

The Hanley brothers were briefly members of fellow ex-Fall member Martin Bramah's group Factory Star. They subsequently joined Brix & the Extricated, (fronted by ex-Fall member Brix Smith Start), who released three albums: Part 2 (2017), Breaking State (2018) and Super Blood Wolf Moon (2019).

In November 2022 Bramah announced a new collaboration with Hanley and his brother Steve - 'House Of All' which also features ex-Fall members Simon Wolstencroft and Pete Greenway. Their self-titled debut album will be released in April 2023 on the Tiny Global Productions label 

Hanley's first book Leave The Capital, a treatise on the rise of Manchester's recording industry, was published in November 2017 by Route Books.
His second book Have a Bleedin Guess, which describes the making and impact of The Fall's Hex Enduction Hour, was published in October 2019, also by Route Books.
In 2021 Paul and Steve began hosting the Fall podcast 'Oh! Brother', interviewing other Fall members, people involved with the group and fans from the world of music about their relationship with The Fall. He is also a frequent guest on the Temporary Fandoms podcast, where he has appeared on episodes about Buzzcocks and Arthur Lee's Love.

Personal life
Paul Hanley is married with three children. In 2018 he gained a B.A. (Hons) in English Literature with the Open University.

He once appeared as a contestant on the ITV quiz show, The Chase, which was shown as a repeat on 9 August 2019, and again on 6 April 2021, but was eliminated, playing for £7000 in the first round.

Discography

With The Fall

Studio albums

Live albums
 1982 Live in London 1980
 1983 Fall in a Hole (Live Auckland 1982)
 1998 Live To Air in Melbourne 1982
 2001 Austurbaejarbio (Live in Reykjavik 1983)
 2005 Live From The Vaults – Glasgow 1981
 2005 Live From The Vaults – Hof Alter Bahnhof 1981

EPs
 1984 Call For Escape Route
 1993 Kimble

Singles
 1980 How I Wrote "Elastic Man"
 1980 Totally Wired
 1981 Lie Dream of a Casino Soul
 1982 Look, Know
 1982 Marquis Cha Cha
 1983 The Man Whose Head Expanded
 1983 Kicker Conspiracy/Wings
 1984 Oh! Brother
 1984 C.R.E.E.P.
 1986 Living Too Late

VHS/DVD
 1983 Perverted By Language Bis (VHS)
 2003 Perverted By Language Bis (DVD)
 2004 Live at the Hacienda 1983–1985 (DVD)

With Marc Riley and The Creepers

Albums
 1984 Cull
 1984 Gross Out

Single
 1983 Favourite Sister/Carry Mi Card (Daft Head)

With Shout Bamalam

EP
 1987 Ambition, The Groover & Greed

With Tom Hingley and The Lovers

Albums
 2004 Abba Are The Enemy
 2008 Highlights

Single
 2003 Yeah

With Brix & The Extricated

Albums
 2017 Part 2
 2018 Breaking State
 2019 Super Blood Wolf Moon

Singles
 2016 Something to Lose
 2017 Damned for Eternity
 2017 Moonrise Kingdom
 2018 Valentino

References

External links
Paul Hanley in conversation at Library Lounge 2017
Paul Hanley page at Route books
Paul Hanley at Discogs

1964 births
Living people
English rock drummers
English songwriters
Musicians from Manchester
English punk rock drummers
The Fall (band) members
Rough Trade Records artists
Beggars Banquet Records artists